Daniel McKenna can refer to:
 Daniel McKenna (general), Chief of Staff of Ireland's Defence Forces during the Second World War
 Daniel McKenna (rally driver), Irish rally driver